Yalamber or Yalung, Yalambar, Yalamwar, Yalamver (Nepali: यलम्बर) was a Kirat warrior and first King of Kirata Kingdom in Nepal. He established Kirata Kingdom in 800 B.C. His capital was Yalakhom, present day Kathmandu Valley (Thankot) after conquering Central Nepal and his kingdom extended from river Trishuli in the west to river Teesta in the east of Bhutan. Patan also known as (Lalitpur in Nepali and Yala in Nepal Bhasa) is resemblance to Yalamber as he ruled the regions.

Brian Houghton Hodgson - Wikipedia elaborated more on the origins.

The epic Mahabharata mentions the Kiratas as a Mleccha tribe along with Pulindas and Chinas, Hunas, Pahlavas, Sakas, Yavanas, Savaras, Paundras, Kanchis, Dravidas, Sinhalas and Keralas. All these tribes were described as Mlechha tribes. The Kamvojas, Gandharas, Kiratas and Barbaras were also mentioned together as northern tribes. The Yavanas, the Kiratas, the Gandharvas, the Chinas, the Savaras, the Barbaras, the Sakas, the Tusharas, the Kankas, the Pathavas, the Andhras, the Madrakas, the Paundras, the Pulindas, the Ramathas, the Kamvojas were mentioned together as tribes beyond the kingdoms of Aryavarta.

In Nepal, Kirati king Yalambar, is believed to be the Barbarik of Mahabharata, son of Ghatotkach and grandson of Bheem. Barbarik had the dubious honor of being slain in the battle of the Mahabharata, in which gods and mortals fought alongside each other. Legend credits him with meeting Indra, the lord of heaven, who ventured into the Valley in human guise. It is said that during the battle of Mahabharata, Barbaric went to witness the battle with a vow to take the side of the losing party. Lord Krishna, knowing the vow of Barbaric and his strength of three arrows, thought that the war would end with only one survival and that is Barbarik himself by killing warriors of both sides. So, by a clever stroke of diplomacy, Lord Krishna cut off Barbarik's head. So, in his honor Indrajatra is celebrated and his head is worshipped as the god Akash Bhairav. Barbarikik is also known as Khatushyam and Baliyadev in Rajasthan and Gujarat respectively.

The decentadants of Kirat, early inhabitants and settlers of Kathmandu valley, celebrate Yenya or Indrajatra in Kathmandu. Newars in Indrachowk are the caregivers for Aakash Bhairava.

His dynasty was succeeded by Licchavi (kingdom). His successors ruled Kathmandu valley for about 31 generations which lasted nearly 1225 years. A list of all 32 Kirat Kings is given in the below section.

List of Jeona
According to Mahabharata, a chronicle of Bansawali William Kirk Patrick and Daniel Wright, The Kirat kings were
 King Shree Yelam - 90 years/१। राजा श्री एलम् - ९० वर्ष, 
 King Shree Pelam - 81 years/राजा श्री पेलं - ८१ वर्ष, 
 King Shree Melam - 89 years/राजा श्री मेलं - ८९ वर्ष, 
 King Shree Changming - 42 years/राजा श्री चंमिं - ४२ वर्ष, 
 King Shree Dhakang - 37 years/राजा श्री धस्कं - ३७ वर्ष, 
 King Shree Walangcha - 31 years 6 months/राजा श्री वलंच - ३१ वर्ष ६ महिना, 
 King Shree Hungting - 40 years 8 months/राजा श्री हुतिं - ४० वर्ष ८ महिना, 
 King Shree Hoorma - 50 years/राजा श्री हुरमा - ५० वर्ष, 
 King Shree Tooske - 41 years 8 months/राजा श्री तुस्के - ४१ वर्ष ८ महिना, 
 King Shree Prasaphung - 38 years 6 months/राजा श्री प्रसफुं - ३८ वर्ष ६ महिना, 
 King Shree Pawa: - 46 years/राजा श्री पवः - ४६ वर्ष, 
 King Shree Daasti - 40 years/राजा श्री दास्ती - ४० वर्ष, 
 King Shree Chamba - 71 years/राजा श्री चम्ब - ७१ वर्ष, 
 King Shree Kongkong - 54 years/राजा श्री कंकं - ५४ वर्ष, 
 King Shree Swananda - 40 years 6 months/राजा श्री स्वनन्द - ४० वर्ष ६ महिना, 
 King Shree Phukong - 58 years/राजा श्री फुकों - ५८ वर्ष, 
 King Shree Singhu - 49 years 6 months/राजा श्री शिंघु - ४९ वर्ष ६ महिना, 
 King Shree Joolam - 73 years 3 months/राजा श्री जुलम् - ७३ वर्ष ३ महिना, 
 King Shree Lookang - 40 years/राजा श्री लुकं - ४० वर्ष, 
 King Shree Thoram - 71 years/राजा श्री थोरम् - ७१ वर्ष, 
 King Shree Thuko - 83 years/राजा श्री थुको - ८३ वर्ष, 
 King Shree Barmma - 73 years 6 months/राजा श्री वर्म्म - ७३ वर्ष ६ महिना, 
 King Shree Gunjong - 72 years 7 months/राजा श्री गुंजं ७२ वर्ष ७ महिना, 
 King Shree Pushka - 81 years/राजा श्री पुस्क - ८१ वर्ष, 
 King Shree Tyapamee - 54 years/राजा श्री त्यपमि - ५४ वर्ष, 
 King Shree Moogmam - 58 years/राजा श्री मुगमम् - ५८ वर्ष, 
 King Shree Shasaru - 63 years/राजा श्री शसरू - ६३ वर्ष, 
 King Shree Goongoong - 74 years/राजा श्री गंणं - ७४ वर्ष, 
 King Shree Khimbung - 76 years/राजा श्री खिम्बुं - ७६ वर्ष, 
 King Shree Girijung - 81 years/राजा श्री गिरीजं - ८१ वर्ष, 
 King Shree Khurangja - 78 years/राजा श्री खुरांज - ७८ वर्ष, 
 King Shree Gasti - 58 years/राजा श्री खिगु - ८५ वर्ष

See also
Kirati people

References

L.C. Shankar 2003, Tharus, the pioneer of civilization of Nepal
D Diwas 2000, Nepalese culture, society, and tourism
KC Tanka 2004, The culture, tourism & nature of Nepal: research, oriented collection of religion, art and culture

8th-century BC Nepalese people
Kiranti
Nepalese monarchs
Place of birth unknown
Place of death unknown
Year of birth unknown
Year of death unknown